Romano Lemm (born 25 June 1984 in Dielsdorf, Switzerland) is a Swiss former professional ice hockey forward who most notably played for EHC Kloten of the National League.

Playing career
On December 3, 2014, he agreed to a three-year contract extension with Kloten worth CHF 2 million.

International play
He participated at the 2010 IIHF World Championship as a member of the Switzerland men's national ice hockey team.

Career statistics

Regular season and playoffs

International

References

External links

1984 births
Living people
HC Lugano players
HC Thurgau players
Ice hockey players at the 2006 Winter Olympics
Ice hockey players at the 2010 Winter Olympics
EHC Kloten players
Olympic ice hockey players of Switzerland
Swiss ice hockey forwards